Tricholoma muscarium is a mushroom found in Japan.

Toxicity
Tricholoma muscarium contains ibotenic acid and tricholomic acid and is considered to be an edible mushroom in Japan.

References

muscarium
Edible fungi
Fungi of Japan
Fungi described in 1954